cURL (pronounced like "curl", UK: ,) is a computer software project providing a library (libcurl) and command-line tool (curl) for transferring data using various network protocols.  The name stands for "Client for URL".

History
cURL was first released in 1996. It was originally named httpget and then became urlget before adopting the current name of cURL. The original author and lead developer is the Swedish developer Daniel Stenberg, who created cURL because he wanted to automate the fetching of currency exchange rates for IRC users.

libcurl
libcurl is a free client-side URL transfer library, supporting cookies, DICT, FTP, FTPS, Gopher, HTTP/1 (with HTTP/2 and HTTP/3 support), HTTP POST, HTTP PUT, HTTP proxy tunneling, HTTPS, IMAP, Kerberos, LDAP, MQTT, POP3, RTSP, RTMP, SCP, SMTP, and SMB. The library supports the file URI scheme, SFTP, Telnet, TFTP, file transfer resume, FTP uploading, HTTP form-based upload, HTTPS certificates, LDAPS, proxies, and user-plus-password authentication.

The libcurl library is portable. It builds and works identically on many platforms, including AIX, AmigaOS, Android, BeOS, BlackBerry Tablet OS and BlackBerry 10, OpenVMS, Darwin, DOS, FreeBSD, HP-UX, HURD, iOS, IRIX, Linux, macOS, NetBSD, NetWare, OpenBSD, OS/2, QNX Neutrino, RISC OS, Solaris, Symbian, Tru64, Ultrix, UnixWare, and Microsoft Windows.

The libcurl library is free, thread-safe and IPv6 compatible. Bindings are available for more than 50 languages, including C/C++, Java, Julia (is bundled with), PHP and Python.

The libcurl library supports GnuTLS, mbed TLS, NSS, gskit on IBM i, SChannel on Windows, Secure Transport on macOS and iOS, SSL/TLS through OpenSSL, BoringSSL, libreSSL, AmiSSL, wolfSSL, BearSSL and rustls.

curl
curl is a command-line tool for getting or sending data including files using URL syntax. Since curl uses libcurl, it supports every protocol libcurl supports.

curl supports HTTPS and performs SSL certificate verification by default when a secure protocol is specified such as HTTPS. When curl connects to a remote server via HTTPS, it will obtain the remote server certificate, then check against its CA certificate store the validity of the remote server to ensure the remote server is the one it claims to be. Some curl packages are bundled with CA certificate store file. The  option can be used to specify the location of the CA certificate store file. In the Windows platform, if a CA certificate file is not specified, curl will look for a CA certificate file name “curl-ca-bundle.crt” in the following order:
 Directory where the curl program is located.
 Current working directory.
 Windows system directory.
 Windows directory.
 Directories specified in the %PATH% environment variables.

curl will return an error message if the remote server is using a self-signed certificate, or if the remote server certificate is not signed by a CA listed in the CA cert file.  or  option can be used to skip certificate verification.  Alternatively, if the remote server is trusted, the remote server CA certificate can be added to the CA certificate store file.

Examples
Basic use of curl involves simply typing  at the command line, followed by the URL of the output to retrieve:

$ curl www.example.com

curl defaults to displaying the output it retrieves to the standard output specified on the system (usually the terminal window).  So running the command above would, on most systems, display the www.example.com source-code in the terminal window. The -o flag can be used to store the output in a file instead:

$ curl -o example.html www.example.com

More options that change the tool's behavior are available.

See also

 curl-loader – an open-source testing tool based on curl
 libwww – an early library that comes with a command line interface
 PowerShell – the iwr (Invoke-WebRequest) Windows PowerShell had functionality akin to curl; class Web-client too.
 Web crawler – an internet bot that can crawl the web
 Wget – similar command-line tool with no associated library but capable of recursive downloading

References

External links

 
 Comparison of curl vs other open source download tools
 

1997 software
C (programming language) libraries
Command-line software
Cross-platform free software
Download managers
Free FTP clients
Free software programmed in C
Free web crawlers
Hypertext Transfer Protocol clients
Software using the MIT license
Telnet
Web scraping